Brandenburg is a surname. Notable people with the surname include:

Bryan Brandenburg (born 1959), American writer and video game designer
Chet Brandenburg (1897–1974), American actor
Daan Brandenburg (born 1987), Dutch chess grandmaster
Ed Brandenburg (1893–1968), American actor
Erich Brandenburg (1868–1946), German historian
Hubertus Brandenburg (1923–2009), German-born Swedish Roman Catholic bishop
Jacob Brandenburg (1899–1981), Polish-born Israeli sculptor
Jens Brandenburg (born 1986), German politician
Jim Brandenburg (photographer) (born 1945), American environmentalist and photographer
Johannes Brandenburg (1910–1942), German Luftwaffe pilot
John N. Brandenburg (1929–2020), United States Army General
Karlheinz Brandenburg (born 1954), German audio engineer and inventor
Mario Brandenburg (born 1983), German politician
Mark Brandenburg (baseball) (born 1970), American baseball pitcher
Mark Brandenburg (politician) (born 1955), American politician
Otto Brandenburg (1934–2007), Danish musician, singer, actor and film score composer
Rick Brandenburg (born 1955), American entomologist
William H. Brandenburg, United States Army Major General
Alain Erlande-Brandenburg (1937–2020), French art historian and specialist on Gothic and Romanesque art